Hol or HOL may refer to:

People 
 Hol (surname)
 K'inich Popol Hol, 5th-century Mayan king

Places
 Hol, a municipality in Buskerud county, Norway
 Old Hol Church
 Hol, Tjeldsund
 Hol, Nordland, Lofoten
 Hol Church (Nordland)
 Hol, Ludhiana, a village in India

Stations
 Hollywood station (Florida) (station code: HOL), USA
 Holmesglen railway station (station code: HOL), Malvern East, Melbourne, Victoria, Australia
 Holsworthy railway station, Sydney (station code: HOL), NSW, Australia
 Holton Heath railway station (station code: HOL), England, UK

Science and technology
 HOL (proof assistant), theorem proving systems
 Head-of-line blocking in computer networking
 Higher-order logic, a branch of symbolic logic
 Holonomy group in differential geometry

Sports and games
 Hol (role-playing game)
 Hol IL, a sports club in Buskerud county
 Hollingworth Lake Rowing Club (prefix code: HOL)
 Holdsworth (cycling team) (UCI code HOL)
 HOL, pre-1992 code for Netherlands at the Olympics

Other uses
 Hands On Learning Australia, a charity
 Hellas On-Line, a Greek Internet service provider
 Holiday Airlines (US airline) (ICAO airline code HOL)
 Holu language (ISO 639 code hol)
 tlhIngan Hol, fictional Klingon language
 Netherlands, ITU code

See also

 Holl
 
 
 h0i
 HOI (disambiguation)
 HO-1 (disambiguation), including HO1
 H1 (disambiguation), including H01